The Unchastened Woman is a 1925 American silent drama film starring vamp Theda Bara, directed by James Young, the former husband of Clara Kimball Young, and released by start-up studio Chadwick Pictures. The film is based on a 1915 Broadway play, The Unchastened Woman, which starred Emily Stevens.

This was Bara's "comeback" film but turned out to be her final feature appearance and is one of her few surviving films. The play was also filmed in 1918 with Grace Valentine.

Plot
As described in a film magazine review, Caroline Knollys detects an intrigue between her husband Hubert and his gold digging secretary Emily Madden. Caroline goes abroad and, after her son is born, becomes a reigning belle. Eventually, she returns home, but keeps her husband in ignorance of the baby boy's birth and retires to a country estate. Hubert repents, but Caroline is obdurate. Because she has been flirting outrageously as part of her revenge, the jealous husband pays an unexpected visit to her, hoping to discover evidence to support a divorce. Instead, Caroline presents him to his son. Husband and wife are reconciled.

Cast

Preservation
Prints of The Unchastened Woman are located in the Cineteca Del Friuli in Gemona del Friuli, George Eastman Museum Motion Picture Collection, and Academy Film Archive.

References

External links
 
 

Progressive Silent Film List: The Unchastened Woman at silentera.com
Lobby poster
Larger scan of lobby poster

1925 films
American silent feature films
Films directed by James Young
American films based on plays
American black-and-white films
1925 drama films
Silent American drama films
Surviving American silent films
1920s American films
English-language drama films
1920s English-language films